World Stadium, is a series of baseball arcade games that were released by Namco in the late 1980s and 1990s; they were spin-offs of the Family Stadium franchise, inspired by the 1986 Famicom game Pro Yakyū Family Stadium, and its sequel Pro Yakyū Family Stadium '87. Except for Great Sluggers '94, which was also released in America, all of the games were exclusive to Japan.

Namco System 1 era (1988–90)
The first two of these stadiums' scoreboards had clocks which started at 6:00 and advanced as the matches progressed (but broke at midnight), and the third stadium's scoreboard also featured the logo of Namco's United States distributor of that time period - Atari Games.

World Stadium was Japan's second highest-grossing arcade game of 1988. It went on to be Japan's seventh highest-grossing arcade conversion kit of 1991.

Namco System 2 era (1991–93)
The next four titles in the series,  (1991),  (1992),  (1992), and  all ran on Namco System 2 hardware; the first of these featured sixteen teams (the Lionels, Buckaroos, Fires, Orients, Giants, Cars, Wheels, Drasans, Sparrows, and Titans from the first three titles, as well as six new teams: the Blue Arrows, Homes, Orbies, Fifties, Nationals, and Americans), but the other three featured the twelve (real-life) teams from the Japanese Central and Pacific Baseball Leagues (the Seibu Lions, Kintetsu Buffaloes, Orix BlueWave, Nippon-Ham Fighters, Fukuoka Daiei Hawks, and Chiba Lotte Marines of the Central League, and the Hiroshima Toyo Carp, Chunichi Dragons, Yakult Swallows, Yomiuri Giants, Yokohama Taiyo Whales (later the Yokohama DeNA Baystars), and Hanshin Tigers of the Pacific League). They also featured four stadiums for matches to take place in (Dome, Kōshien from the first three titles, Seaside and Manhattan) - again, the first three stadiums' scoreboards had clocks upon them (the third was digital), but they were broken (and the first two were stuck at 6:00, while the third just displayed the colon between the numbers). SWS '92 G also introduced a "FAVOR" setting in its options menu.

Namco NB-1 era (1993–97)
The next arcade baseball game Namco released was Great Sluggers: New World Stadium in 1993. It was the first to run on Namco NB-1 hardware, and featured the 12 teams from Nippon Professional Baseball. A sequel was also released in 1994, titled Great Sluggers '94 in Japan and Great Sluggers: Featuring 1994 Team Rosters in America. The Japanese version featured Nippon Professional Baseball teams, and the American version featured Major League Baseball teams. SWS '96 also introduced five "optional ball clubs" - the Sixties, Seventies, Eighties, Nineties and USA, while the Urban Stadium was merely the Kōshien Stadium from the previous games renamed.

Namco System 12 era (1998–2001)
The last four titles in the series, and  all ran on Namco System 12 hardware, and featured eighteen teams (the twelve real-life teams from the last six games and the USA team from the last two, along with five new teams: the Central League All-Stars, Pacific League All-Stars, Namco All-Stars, Nikotama Gals, and User Team). It also featured twelve stadiums for its matches to take place in (Seaside from the last seven games and Hillside, Air Dome, Urban, Trad, and Kaihei Dome from the last three games - along with the new Bay Area, Owari Dome, Naniwa Dome, Forest, Setōchi, and Kasenjiki). The Namco All-Stars and Nikotama Gals feature twenty-three of Namco's most famous characters; however, the pitchers of the former team are merely named after five others.

Notes

References

External links
Namco arcade hardware page at System16.com - The Arcade Museum
Namco System 1 hardware page at System16.com - The Arcade Museum

1988 video games
Arcade video games
Family Stadium and spin-offs
Namco arcade games
Bandai Namco Entertainment franchises
Japan-exclusive video games
X68000 games
Video games developed in Japan